Gregory "Buddy" Howell Jr. (born March 27, 1996) is an American football running back who is a free agent. He played college football at Florida Atlantic, where he played in 39 games with 16 starts and finished his career with 463 carries for 2,424 yards and 22 touchdowns. Howell signed with the Miami Dolphins after going undrafted in the 2018 NFL Draft.

Professional career

Miami Dolphins
Howell signed with the Miami Dolphins as an undrafted free agent following the 2018 NFL Draft. He was waived by the team on September 1, 2018.

Houston Texans
On September 2, 2018, Howell was claimed off waivers by the Houston Texans. He signed a contract extension with the team on March 1, 2021. He was waived on August 31, 2021.

Los Angeles Rams
On September 2, 2021, Howell was signed to the Los Angeles Rams practice squad. He was promoted to the active roster on October 19, 2021. He was placed on injured reserve on December 4, and activated on December 25. Howell won Super Bowl LVI when the Rams defeated the Cincinnati Bengals 23–20.

References 

1996 births
Living people
American football running backs
Coral Gables Senior High School alumni
Florida Atlantic Owls football players
Houston Texans players
Los Angeles Rams players
Miami Dolphins players
Players of American football from Miami